Iñigo Orozco Andonegui (born 24 February 1993), sometimes referred to as Iñigo Orozko, is a Spanish footballer who plays as a forward for SD Amorebieta.

Club career
Orozco was born in San Sebastián, Gipuzkoa, Basque Country. After finishing his formation with SD Leioa, he made his senior debut with SD Deusto in the regional leagues before joining Tercera División side Bermeo FT in 2013.

In 2014, Orozco moved to fellow fourth division side Santutxu FC, being the club's top goalscorer in the 2016–17 season as they narrowly avoided relegation. On 6 June 2017, he signed for Sestao River Club in the same category, and scored a career-best 15 goals during the campaign as his side missed out promotion in the play-offs.

On 20 July 2018, Orozco was presented at Segunda División B side SD Amorebieta. In the 2020–21 season, he scored twice as his side achieved a first-ever promotion to Segunda División; one of his goals was the winner in a 2–1 away success over Linares Deportivo, which qualified the club to the final stage of the play-offs.

Orozco made his professional debut on 14 August 2021, coming on as a second-half substitute for Iker Unzueta in a 0–2 away loss against Girona FC.

Personal life
While playing amateur football, Orozco also worked as a biology and geology teacher in an institute in Andoain.

References

External links

1993 births
Living people
Footballers from San Sebastián
Spanish footballers
Association football forwards
Segunda División players
Segunda División B players
Tercera División players
Divisiones Regionales de Fútbol players
SD Deusto players
Sestao River footballers
SD Amorebieta footballers
Bermeo FT footballers
Santutxu FC players